In probability and statistics, the Hellinger distance (closely related to, although different from, the Bhattacharyya distance) is used to quantify the similarity between two probability distributions. It is a type of f-divergence.  The Hellinger distance is defined in terms of the Hellinger integral, which was introduced by Ernst Hellinger in 1909.

It is sometimes called the Jeffreys distance.

Definition

Measure theory
To define the Hellinger distance in terms of measure theory, let  and  denote two probability measures on a measure space  that are absolutely continuous with respect to an auxiliary measure . Such a measure always exists, e.g .

For compactness, the above formula is often written as

Probability theory using Lebesgue measure
To define the Hellinger distance in terms of elementary probability theory, we take λ to be the Lebesgue measure, so that dP / dλ and dQ / dλ are simply probability density functions.  If we denote the densities as f and g, respectively, the squared Hellinger distance can be expressed as a standard calculus integral

where the second form can be obtained by expanding the square and using the fact that the integral of a probability density over its domain equals 1.

The Hellinger distance H(P, Q) satisfies the property (derivable from the Cauchy–Schwarz inequality)

Discrete distributions
their Hellinger distance is defined as

 

which is directly related to the Euclidean norm of the difference of the square root vectors, i.e.
 

Also,

Properties
The Hellinger distance forms a bounded metric on the space of probability distributions over a given probability space.

The maximum distance 1 is achieved when P assigns probability zero to every set to which Q assigns a positive probability, and vice versa.

Sometimes the factor  in front of the integral is omitted, in which case the Hellinger distance ranges from zero to the square root of two.

The Hellinger distance is related to the Bhattacharyya coefficient  as it can be defined as

 

Hellinger distances are used in the theory of sequential and asymptotic statistics.

 

 

 

 

 

 
where  is the beta function.

 
where  is the gamma function.

Connection with total variation distance 

The Hellinger distance  and the total variation distance (or statistical distance)  are related as follows:

 

The constants in this inequality may change depending on which renormalization you choose ( or ).

These inequalities follow immediately from the inequalities between the 1-norm and the 2-norm.

See also
 Statistical distance
 Kullback–Leibler divergence
 Bhattacharyya distance
 Total variation distance
 Fisher information metric

Notes

References
 
 
 

Theory of probability distributions
F-divergences
Statistical distance